Xyphinus is a genus of goblin spiders that was first described by Eugène Louis Simon in 1893.

Species
 it contains twenty species, found only in Asia, India, and Australia:
Xyphinus abanghamidi Deeleman-Reinhold, 1987 – Borneo
Xyphinus acutus Kranz-Baltensperger, 2014 – Borneo
Xyphinus baehrae Kranz-Baltensperger, 2014 – India to Australia
Xyphinus deelemanae Kranz-Baltensperger, 2014 – Borneo
Xyphinus distortus Kranz-Baltensperger, 2014 – Thailand, Malaysia
Xyphinus gibber Deeleman-Reinhold, 1987 – Borneo
Xyphinus holgeri Kranz-Baltensperger, 2014 – Thailand, Laos, Malaysia, Indonesia (Borneo), Brunei
Xyphinus hwangi Tong & Li, 2014 – Taiwan
Xyphinus hystrix Simon, 1893 (type) – Malaysia, Singapore
Xyphinus infaustus Kranz-Baltensperger, 2014 – Indonesia (Sumatra)
Xyphinus karschi (Bösenberg & Strand, 1906) – China, Thailand, Taiwan, Japan
Xyphinus krabi Kranz-Baltensperger, 2014 – Thailand
Xyphinus lemniscatus Deeleman-Reinhold, 1987 – Borneo
Xyphinus montanus Deeleman-Reinhold, 1987 – Borneo
Xyphinus pachara Kranz-Baltensperger, 2014 – Malaysia
Xyphinus pakse Tong & Li, 2013 – Laos
Xyphinus rogerfedereri Kranz-Baltensperger, 2014 – Malaysia, Thailand
Xyphinus sabal Kranz-Baltensperger, 2014 – Borneo
Xyphinus xanthus Deeleman-Reinhold, 1987 – Borneo
Xyphinus xelo Deeleman-Reinhold, 1987 – Malaysia

See also
 List of Oonopidae species

References

Araneomorphae genera
Oonopidae
Spiders of Asia
Spiders of Australia